James William Anderson III (born November 1, 1937), known professionally as Bill Anderson, is an American country music singer, songwriter, and television host. His soft-spoken singing voice was given the nickname "Whispering Bill" by music critics and writers. As a songwriter, his compositions have been covered by various music artists since the late 1950s, including Ray Price and George Strait.

Anderson was raised in Decatur, Georgia, and began composing songs while in high school. While enrolled in college, he wrote the song "City Lights", which later became a major hit for Ray Price in 1958. His songwriting led to his first recording contract with Decca Records the same year. Anderson began having major hits shortly thereafter. In 1963, he had released his most successful single in his recording career, "Still". The song became a major country pop crossover hit and was followed by a series of top ten hits. These songs included "I Love You Drops", "I Get the Fever" and  "Wild Week-End". His songs were being notably recorded by other artists. In 1964, Connie Smith had her first major hit with his composition "Once a Day". In 1971, Cal Smith had a number one single with Anderson's "The Lord Knows I'm Drinking".

In the 1970s, Anderson continued having major hits as a recording artist as well. Songs including "Love Is a Sometimes Thing", "All the Lonely Women in the World" and "World of Make Believe" became major hits. As the decade progressed his style moved towards the polished countrypolitan genre of country music, with songs such as "I Can't Wait Any Longer". He was dropped from his record label in the early 1980s and began a brief career in television which included hosting the game shows The Better Sex and Fandango. Anderson began writing songs again in the early 1990s for the next generation of country performers. Collaborating with other writers, he wrote material that would go on to become hits for Vince Gill, George Strait, Kenny Chesney, and Steve Wariner in the next two decades.

Anderson also continued recording into the 1990s. In 1998, he released his first major label album in over a decade, entitled Fine Wine. He continued releasing music through his own TWI record label. This included projects of gospel and bluegrass material. His most recent studio album was released in 2020. In his career as both a writer and performer, he has received awards from the Academy of Country Music, Country Music Association, Songwriters Hall of Fame and the Nashville Songwriters Hall of Fame.

Early life
Anderson was born James William Anderson III to Elizabeth and James William Anderson Jr. in Columbia, South Carolina. He was the oldest of two children. His sister, Elizabeth Anderson, was born two years after. Anderson's father was an insurance agent while his mother was a homemaker. He spent his early childhood with his family in Columbia. The family moved to his grandparents' home in Griffin, Georgia, while Anderson was in the third grade. Shortly afterward, the family relocated into their own home in Decatur, Georgia, where he spent the remainder of his childhood. In Decatur, his father opened his own insurance agency firm, which he continued to own until his retirement. In his 2016 autobiography, Anderson described his childhood as "average", recalling that he "never went to bed hungry" even though the family did not have many material possessions. 

In school, Anderson was active in 4-H organizations and played both baseball and football. However, he was most interested in music, having been inspired by his grandparents who played instruments. His interest grew further after watching country musicians perform on a radio station, located directly above his father's insurance company. Anderson soon saved enough money to purchase his own guitar. At age ten, he wrote his first song called "Carry Me Home Texas".

In high school, Anderson and his friends formed their own band and won a school talent contest. The band began performing around the local area, eventually performing on local radio as "The Avondale Playboys". Anderson's strong interest in baseball continued through high school as well. He became his high school team's pitcher and was scouted to go to the Chicago Cubs training camp. However, Anderson declined the offer after realizing that his family would be upset if he did not attend college. Upon graduating high school, he enrolled at the University of Georgia and majored in journalism.

Anderson had dabbled with journalism before enrolling in university. While still in high school, he wrote for his school's newspaper and also obtained a job covering sports events for The Atlanta Journal-Constitution. In his freshman year, he pledged the Kappa Sigma Fraternity. He and several students formed a country band called the "Classic City Playboys" and began playing local events. He also became interested in radio station work after a DJ friend introduced him to some of the controls. "I thought I was Superman. I knew that night I had to get a job as a disc jockey", he recalled.

Anderson graduated from college in 1959. During his first summer out of college, he got a job working as a rock and roll DJ at WGAU in Athens, Georgia. However, he was fired after playing country records over the air and was then hired at WJJC in Commerce, Georgia. Anderson began songwriting again after obtaining the new position. In Commerce, Anderson wrote the song "City Lights". The song ultimately brought him to Nashville where both his songwriting and recording career began.

Recording career

1958–1962: Early success
Anderson's own recording career began in 1957 after releasing two singles for the independent label, TNT. Both songs (including his own version of "City Lights") attracted little attention. However, the success brought by Ray Price's version of "City Lights" led Anderson to frequent Nashville, Tennessee. In the city, he brought compositions for artists and producers to record. Owen Bradley of Decca Records was impressed by Anderson's writing and decided to sign him as a recording artist to the label. Anderson officially signed with Decca in the summer of 1958. His early Decca singles were entirely self-composed. Anderson's first Decca released was issued in December 1958 called "That's What It's Like to Be Lonesome". The song became a major hit the following year when it climbed to the number 12 position on the Billboard Hot Country and Western Sides chart. He followed this in 1959 with the top 20 hits "Ninety Nine" and "Dead or Alive". 

In 1960, "The Tip of My Fingers" became his first top ten hit on the country chart, reaching number seven in August 1960. The song would later be recorded and made hits individually by Eddy Arnold, Roy Clark, Jean Shepard and Steve Wariner. In 1961, the single "Po' Folks" reached number nine on the Billboard country songs chart. The success of "Po' Folks" led Anderson to receive an invitation to join the Grand Ole Opry cast. Anderson accepted and joined the program the same year.  He is, as of 2022, the longest-standing active Opry member. This was followed by his first number-one hit, "Mama Sang a Song". It was also his first single to chart on the Billboard Hot 100, reaching number 89. Although successful, Anderson's early singles were not initially included on studio album releases. Instead, Decca issued his early hits on the 1962 compilation Bill Anderson Sings Country Heart Songs.

1963–1976: "Still" and further career success
By 1963, Anderson's recording career was expanding further. He was frequently touring and making public appearances to promote his music. Anderson was inspired to write his 1963 composition, "Still", after encountering an ex-girlfriend while promoting a song. The same night, he wrote the lyrics to the track on an Underwood typewriter at three o'clock in the morning. "Still" became the biggest single of his recording career. In April 1963, it reached number one on the Billboard country and western songs chart. It also became his second single to reach the Billboard Hot 100, but was his first (and only) successful crossover hit there, reaching number eight in June 1963. The track was also his first single to become a hit on the Billboard easy listening chart, reaching number three that June. The song's success led to the 1963 release of Anderson's debut studio album of the same name. The LP reached number ten on the Billboard country albums chart in January 1964 and the top 40 of the Billboard 200 in late 1963.

The success of "Still" further elevated Anderson's recording career. This included making national television appearances on shows such as American Bandstand, where he performed his follow-up crossover hit "8×10". He won awards from several major music publications including Billboard, Cashbox and Music Reporter. He scheduled more concert engagements and made as much as $500 per gig. His success led Decca to record and release studio albums with more frequency. These albums were also successful. His second studio LP, Bill Anderson Sings (1964), reached the top ten of the country albums chart. His 1966 studio release reached number one on the same chart. Album releases were fueled by further hit singles, including "Bright Lights and Country Music", "Five Little Fingers" and "Three A.M." Music writers took notice of Anderson's music success as well. Billboard magazine called his 1964 album, Showcase, "a powerful set of performances". Kurt Wolff of the book Country Music: The Rough Guide credited his success to a "fairly safe and suburban" musical style.

His chart hits continued through the 1960s and many of these songs were self-composed. His 1966 release, "I Love You Drops", was inspired by the Chuck Berry hit "Memphis Tennessee". His next self-written release would also become his third number one hit, entitled "I Get the Fever". He had further top ten hits with "Get While the Gettin's Good" and "No One's Gonna Hurt You Anymore". During this time, Anderson formed his own touring band which he named "The Po' Boys" after his 1961 hit. The band frequently received credit on his studio albums and single releases. He also started his own television program called The Bill Anderson Show, which was taped in Canada and Nashville. In the mid 1960s, he began performing duets with country artist Jan Howard, who was also on Decca Records. Believing they could be a successful recording partnership, the pair approached producer Owen Bradley with the idea of recording together. Bradley agreed and the duo released their first single in 1965. In 1968, the pair had their first major hit with the duet "For Loving You". The song became a number one hit on the Billboard country chart and led to several more successful collaborations.

Following several more hits, Anderson reached the number one position for a fifth time in May 1969 with "My Life (Throw It Away If I Want To)". Both this, and the hit "But You Know I Love You", were included on his 1969 studio album. He began diversifying his album releases during this period with the recording of a gospel LP, I Can Do Nothing Alone, in 1967 and a holiday LP, Christmas, in 1969. A greatest hits package, Bill Anderson's Greatest Hits, was also issued and it reached number six on the country albums survey. Anderson continued releasing regular country albums as well, outputting as much as three per year by the early 1970s. His country LP's often included a mix of original material and cover versions. On his 1971 release, Always Remember, Greg Adams of Allmusic commented that it "confounds expectations" for delivering original vocal performances of songs first cut by Kris Kristofferson and Kenny Rogers. A series of uninterrupted top ten hits followed his early 1970s albums. During this time frame, he had hits with "Love Is a Sometimes Thing", "Where Have All Our Heroes Gone", "If You Can Live with It (I Can Live Without It)" and "The Corner of My Life". In February 1974, he had his first number one hit in five years with "World of Make Believe".

1977–1989: Countrypolitan shift and new changes
By 1977, Anderson experienced several changes in his recording career. His longtime duet partner, Jan Howard, left his record label and road show. According to Howard, it was difficult to keep up with the busy touring schedule. She was replaced by Mary Lou Turner. In 1976, the Turner-Anderson  pairing had a number one hit with the song, "Sometimes". Anderson's longtime label was renamed to MCA Records during the same time frame. Changes at the label continued when his longtime producer (Owen Bradley) was replaced by Buddy Killen. Anderson's first assignment with Killen was the 1977 studio release, Scorpio. With Killen, Anderson's musical sound shifted from Nashville Sound ballads towards uptempo Countrypolitan tunes. The new sound was reflected in his latest albums and singles. In 1977, Anderson had two major hits with the uptempo "Head to Toe" and "Still the One". The following year, Anderson had a major hit with the disco-flavored "I Can't Wait Any Longer". The song peaked at number four on the Billboard country singles chart and reached number 80 on the Hot 100. Its corresponding studio effort, Love...& Other Sad Stories, reached number 37 on the Billboard country albums list.

Although successful at first, Anderson's late-1970s music received negative criticism from many writers. Author Kurt Wolff criticized his new image, commenting that his music "flirted dangerously with disco beats". Eugene Chadbourne of Allmusic only gave his Love...& Other Sad Stories album 1.5 out of 5 stars. "This is an album that begins with what sounds like a pervert and ends with an effect described as frightening. Too bad most of it is so boring to listen to", Chadbourne concluded. Anderson's sales success began to decline following the release of "I Can't Wait Any Longer". His follow-up album, Ladies Choice (1979), only reached number 44 on the country albums chart. The album's only major hit was the top 20 single "This Is a Love Song". After the release of his final MCA album in 1980, he was dropped from the label.

In the mid 1980s, Anderson shifted his professional interests. He began a brief television career in California. However, he continued recording music sporadically during the decade. On the independent Southern Tracks label, he released Southern Fried in 1983. The album was co-produced by Anderson and musician Mike Johnson. The album also spawned four singles that became minor hits on the country songs chart, including the title track. In 1986, Anderson released A Place in the Country, which was also produced by Johnson. The record was also released in the United Kingdom with a different track list. Four singles were spawned from the album that became minor country hits between 1984 and 1987.

1990–present: New artistic directions
Beginning in the early 1990s, Anderson focused more on songwriting. However, he continued recording his own music. Anderson's first studio release of the decade was 1992's Country Music Heaven, issued on Curb Records. It was a collection of gospel songs that was inspired by his grandfather, a Methodist preacher. The album's title track was issued as a single, but did not chart in any Billboard music publications. The single was reviewed by Billboard magazine in 1992 where it received comparisons to music by Garth Brooks. In 1998, Anderson was signed to Warner Bros. Records as part of a veterans artists project that included Ronnie Milsap and Connie Smith. That year, his 36th studio offering entitled Fine Wine was released. The project was produced by Steve Wariner and his wife Caryn. John Weisberger of Country Standard Time gave the release a positive response, calling the songs "vintage". Meanwhile, Allmusic only gave it 2.5 out of 5 stars. He began taking new artistic directions with his next studio release, A Lot of Things Different (2001). The album represented a traditional country style, which Anderson called his most traditional effort yet. It was released on Varèse Sarabande, which Anderson distributed music through in conjunction with his own record label, TWI. 

Anderson's artistic directions continued expanding into the 2000s. After the release of another holiday album, No Place Like Home on Christmas, he released a third gospel project in 2004, Softly & Tenderly. A year later, he released a contemporary country album entitled The Way I Feel. It included his own version of Brad Paisley's "Whiskey Lullaby", along with his own compositions. It was reviewed positively by Al Campbell, who praised its songwriting quality. In 2007, Anderson released his first collection of bluegrass music called Whisperin' Bluegrass. Released on Madacy Entertainment, it included collaborations with Vince Gill and Dolly Parton. Chet Flippo of Country Music Television called it "a terrific album of country and gospel songs done up with bluegrass instrumentation".

In 2010 and 2014, respectively, Anderson released two self-produced studio albums: Songwriter and Life!. In 2018, his 44th studio effort, Anderson, was issued and featured a collaboration with Jamey Johnson.  He followed this with his 45th studio recording in 2020 called The Hits Re-Imagined. The album was a collection of re-recorded hits and songs Anderson had written in his career. Billboard gave the record a favorable review which stated, "At 82, Anderson brings a gravitas to the heavier songs and a lightheartedness to tunes like "Po Folks" with a low-key production that keeps the focus squarely on Anderson and his delivery. Just as it should be". In June 2022, a compilation titled The Best of Bill Anderson: As Far as I Can See was released by MCA Nashville and included a new track featuring Dolly Parton.

Songwriting career

1958–1979: Breakthrough in Nashville
Anderson's writing career began during the same period as his recording career. His 1958 composition, "City Lights", ultimately led to his songwriting success. In an interview with Ken Burns, Anderson recalled writing the song on a hotel roof: "I was up there one night in 1957 – I was nineteen years old – and I managed to write the 'bright array of city lights as far as I can see'", he recalled. After Anderson's own version was released, it was brought to the attention of country artist Ray Price. It was picked up by his record label and became a number one hit on the national country charts in 1958. 

The success of "City Lights" led Anderson to receive a contract from the Tree Writing music publishing company in Nashville. The Tree contract allowed Anderson to write songs for his own music and others. Among his next hits as a writer was "I Missed Me", which was cut by Jim Reeves. The single became a major country hit after reaching number three in December 1960. Another hit was "I Don't Love You Anymore", which was recorded by Charlie Louvin in 1964. Released as a single, the song became Lovin's biggest solo hit, reaching number four on the Billboard Hot Country Singles chart. That same year, Lefty Frizzell recorded Anderson's "Saginaw, Michigan". The single became Frizzell's first number one hit since 1952, topping the charts in March 1964. During this time, he wrote two hits for Porter Wagoner, including 1964's "I'll Go Down Swinging". He was inspired to write the song after hearing the song title at the end of a Hank Snow record. Anderson also wrote solo hits for his duet partner, Jan Howard, in the 1960s. She had major hits with the Anderson-penned "Count Your Blessings, Woman", "I Still Believe in Love" and "Bad Seed". The latter track was a top ten hit for Howard in 1966.

Anderson also wrote several hits for Connie Smith. He was also responsible for helping Smith sign her first recording contract. Anderson had discovered Smith after hearing her perform in a talent contest near Columbus, Ohio. He helped bring her to Nashville, where she recorded several demonstration tapes that were heard by producers at RCA Victor Records. In 1964, Smith was signed to the label. Anderson's composition "Once a Day" was recorded by Smith in 1964. Released as her debut single, it spent a total of eight weeks on the Billboard Hot Country Singles chart, becoming his most successful hit as a writer at that point. Smith's career was further facilitated by Anderson, who wrote many of her follow-up hits such as "Then and Only Then", "Cincinnati, Ohio" and "I Never Once Stopped Loving You". Anderson further helped her professional career by helping her become a member of the Grand Ole Opry and make an appearance on The Lawrence Welk Show. "From the beginning, I liked Connie a lot personally and tried to help her", he recalled in his 2016 autobiography.

Anderson also wrote material for pop artists during this time. In the 1960s, Brenda Lee recorded Anderson's "My Whole World Is Falling Down". The single peaked at number 24 on the Billboard Hot 100 in August 1963. Other pop artists to record Anderson's material included James Brown, Aretha Franklin and Dean Martin. However, his most successful material would be recorded by country artist, who continued recording his songs into the next decade. In 1972, Cal Smith cut Anderson's "The Lord Knows I'm Drinking", which became a number one hit on the Billboard country chart. The following year, Jean Shepard recorded Anderson's "Slippin Away". The single became Shepard's first top-ten hit in four years and she had further top-twenty hits that decade with Anderson-penned compositions. That same decade, Conway Twitty also had a number-one hit with the tune "I May Never Get to Heaven".

1980–1991: Writing shifts
Anderson's writing and recording career both slowed down at the same time. In the early 1980s, he began writing music less frequently. Instead, he began focusing on other projects in television. "I just knew that this is what I wanted to do for my life's work, but I do remember telling people I'd stop if it wasn't working out", he said in describing his move away from writing. In a 2020 interview with American Songwriter, Anderson also explained that the country market was shifting towards crossover pop. For that reason, he found it difficult to write material for other artists. "Country music was changing and I was wondering if I could still fit in. I don't know how I got in that funk, but it was a tough time", he recalled.

Anderson did not fully stop writing material for his own albums. On his 1983 studio release, Southern Fried, he wrote three of the record's tracks. His 1986 studio album, A Place in the Country, contained two tracks written (or co-written) by Anderson. However, only one album track was self-composed: the song "We May Never Pass This Way Again.' Both of these self-composed tracks were only included on the version of the album released in the United Kingdom. Anderson turned his writing priorities towards other directions as well. In 1989, he released his first autobiography, Whisperin' Bill, via Longstreet Press. It was reviewed by Publishers Weekly in August 1989, giving it a mostly positive response: "Despite a measure of hoopla and hyperbole ('I did it . . . I did it all . . . but it wasn't easy'), the author does justice to a powerful story", reviewers commented.

1992–present: Return to songwriting and collaborations with others
In 1992, country artist Steve Wariner recorded Anderson's 1960 hit "The Tip of My Fingers". Released as a single, it became a top-five hit on the Billboard Hot Country Songs chart that year and inspired Anderson to write again. "Steve's version of 'Tips' was some indication that words, melodies and emotions can carry across decades", he commented. Among his next compositions was a song co-written with Vince Gill entitled "Which Bridge to Cross (Which Bridge to Burn)". The song was written in a "writing appointment", where composers make arrangements to write music and are paid by recording hours in a time clock. "Which Bridge to Cross" was released as a single by Gill in 1994 and became a major hit, peaking at number four on the Billboard country chart. According to Anderson, the song's success helped him gain credibility with younger songwriters in Nashville. He began receiving phone calls from other writers and performers to set up more writing appointments. Anderson, who was not used to writing with others, decided to make adaptations to his own songwriting style in order to collaborate. "I let a lot of young kids tell me a lot of things, and I benefited from that, greatly", he recounted.

Anderson began co-writing more frequently during the 1990s. Wariner had another hit in 1999 with another Anderson composition titled "Two Teardrops". The song became a major hit when it reached number two on the country songs chart in June 1999. The song was also nominated for a Grammy award. During the same period, he collaborated with Skip Ewing and Debbie Moore on the song "Wish You Were Here". The song was released as a single by Mark Wills and became a number one hit on the Billboard country chart in 1999. Anderson later commented that the song's success helped him resolve financial struggles he had battled during the decade. He followed "Wish You Were Here" with the song "A Lot of Things Different", which was co-written with Dean Dillon. The song was written during an exchange the pair had while out to breakfast. The song was later recorded by Kenny Chesney, whose version reached number six on the country singles chart in 2003.

Chesney's song was followed by a track later recorded by Brad Paisley and Alison Krauss called "Whiskey Lullaby". The tune was composed with singer-songwriter Jon Randall. After writing the song, Randall was reluctant to record a demo of the record to pitch to other artists. However, Anderson believed the song could be a success and its demo was then recorded at ten o'clock on a weeknight. Paisley's version was released as a single in 2004 and peaked at number three on the Billboard country chart that year. In 2005, "Whiskey Lullaby" won "Song of the Year" at the Country Music Association Awards. Anderson recalled the excitement of winning the accolade in his autobiography: "I jumped up and hugged Brad and knocked his white western hat from his head."

In 2006, Anderson co-wrote a song with Jamey Johnson and Buddy Cannon called "Give It Away". The song would later be cut by George Strait. The song's concept was inspired by Johnson's divorce at the time and included a spoken narration, a device that was not popular in the country genre during the mid-2000s. Strait's version was released as a single in 2006 and reached number one on the country chart that September. The song later won "Song of the Year" from the CMA Awards, becoming Anderson's third accolade from the awards show in the last three years. Later that decade, Anderson collaborated with other writers to compose "Joey" for the country duo Sugarland. The single reached the top 20 of the country songs chart in 2009. In 2014, Anderson co-wrote Mo Pitney's top-30 country hit "Country" with Pitney and Bobby Tomberlin.

Other career contributions

Film and television
Between 1965 and 1974, Anderson hosted his own national television series called The Bill Anderson Show. The program also featured Jan Howard (his duet partner) and The Po' Boys (his touring band). The show was first filmed in Windsor, Ontario and Charlotte, North Carolina. Filming was later moved to the General Electric Broadcasting Facility in Nashville, Tennessee. Broadcasting from Nashville made traveling easier since Anderson lived in the city. On an average filming day, Anderson would tape two thirty minute shows in front of a live audience. Around this time, he also appeared in several country music vehicle films. This included The Las Vegas Hillbillys, which featured country artists Sonny James and Connie Smith. He also made appearances on several national television shows during this time, including The Today Show.

Anderson ventured further into television in the late 1970s. Between 1977 and 1978, he and Sarah Purcell co-hosted the ABC game show The Better Sex. In 1980, he appeared on two episodes of the ABC soap opera One Life to Live, portraying a fictionalized version of himself. In a 1980 interview, then-ABC vice president Jackie Smith called the decision "a first" for a country artist. Also in the 1980s, Anderson hosted the program Backstage at the Grand Ole Opry and the game show Fandango, which both aired on the former Nashville Network (TNN). Fandango was brought to Anderson's attention by the program director of WSM TV in Nashville, who believed that a country music trivia show would be successful for the network. "I've gotten into a lot of different things. I'm probably in the public eye more right now than I've ever been because of the things that I do on television", he said in 1988. He remained with Fandango until 1989. Anderson was then invited to join the cast of the TNN competition program You Can Be a Star. Anderson was involved in the show's inner workings, including helping to develop the scoring system. In addition, his touring band was hired as the show's stage band.

Anderson appeared as himself in the February 15, 1965, episode of To Tell the Truth, receiving two of the four possible votes. Major League Baseball pitcher Tracy Stallard appeared as one of the two imposters for Anderson.

Business career
Anderson also focused on business opportunities, many of which were unsuccessful. In his autobiography, he commented, "I've tried to become a businessman a couple of times when I should have kept right on pickin' and grinnin'." In 1975, he bought a radio station in Provo, Utah, called KIXX. Anderson was unable to have enough advertisers support his radio station, causing it to fail. Six years later, he sold the station and left the radio industry. "I was totally disillusioned by something I love", he wrote in 2016.

In the 1980s, Anderson served as a spokesperson for the Po' Folks restaurant chain, whose name was taken from his 1961 hit song. Anderson signed a three-year contract with the restaurant company to serve as their national spokesperson, appearing in radio and television commercials. In addition, Anderson signed off on allowing the company to use his photos and signatures to endorse their products. He then partnered with the vice president to help franchise the company. Country artist Conway Twitty was selected as a third partner to also help with franchising. However, several individual restaurants encountered financial struggles, which resulted in legal fees that Anderson had to pay. In addition, the company was being bought out by the larger Krystal fast food chain. He was forced to pay back fees he owed towards the company, causing Anderson to nearly declare bankruptcy. However, with the support of Twitty, Anderson helped pay off the company's financial entanglements. "Even as it stood, my little foray into the restaurant business wiped out a large chunk of my life's savings", he later said.

Personal life
Anderson has been married twice and has had two documented long-term relationships. He met his first wife, Bette, in the late 1950s through a mutual friend. The pair married in December 1959. At the time of their marriage, Bette was 19 and Bill was 22. The couple remained married for ten years. Bette gave birth to two daughters during their relationship together. Bette also contributed to her husband's writing career when she co-wrote the 1965 song, "I Can't Remember". It would later be recorded by Connie Smith on her 1965 studio album Cute 'n' Country. The pair separated in 1968 and officially divorced in 1969. Reflecting on his divorce in 2016, Anderson believed it was difficult for Bette to understand the music business, causing them to drift apart. Bette Anderson died in 2010 at the age of 69.

In 1970, he married his second wife, Becky. Together the couple had one child. In 1984, Becky was involved in a car accident that caused "25 percent brain impairment." The couple filed a lawsuit against the driver who had crashed into Becky's vehicle. The recovery process took several years. The couple separated in the 1990s before officially divorcing in 1997. Anderson briefly dated Deborah Marlin following his second divorce. In 2003, Anderson was arrested after being accused by Marlin of hitting her with his car door. He was released from jail the same day.

Anderson began dating Vickie Salas around 2008. The couple had first met years prior when she was 19 and was romantically involved with Anderson's band member. The two reconnected following Anderson's second divorce. "We never married, we never lived together, but she became my everything", Anderson later remembered. In 2016, Salas was diagnosed with cancer. Three years later, the disease intensified and she began receiving hospice care. She died in January 2019.

Musical styles
As a songwriter, Anderson has composed a variety of material. Author Kurt Wolff called his early compositions "cute and sentimental", citing "Po' Folks" and "I Love You Drops" to be examples of this style. Wolff also noted that other songs exemplified "anti-establishment attitudes" while other songs focused on themes that were "desperately bleak". Riane Konc of The Boot noted a similar trend in his songwriting style. She highlighted 2004's "Whiskey Lullaby" as an example. In reviewing the song, Konc commented that it was "packed full of unforgettable images" related to "heartbreak, addiction and loss". Konc also praised 2006's "Give It Away", calling it an "instant classic". In a 2018 interview with American Songwriter, Anderson described his songwriting style: "The lyric is what attracted me to country music as a young boy– the story songs that I could listen to and feel some emotion. So yeah, I'd like to have the next generation pull out a few lines I've written and say 'yeah that's pretty clever!'"

Anderson also created a musical style as a recording artist. After signing with Decca Records, he was given the nickname of "Whisperin' Bill Anderson", due to his soft-spoken vocal performance. Writer and critic Kurt Wolff has commented on his "whispering" vocal style. Wolff also noted that many of his recordings included a combination of both "singing and recitation". Steve Huey of Allmusic called his voice "airy" and "gentle". Stephen L. Betts of Rolling Stone commented that Anderson continues to demonstrate a whispering quality into his current work. In 2020, Betts stated that Anderson's vocal style "remains subdued in the present".

Legacy
Writers and music critics have considered Anderson one of country music's most significant songwriters. Steve Huey of AllMusic called him "one of the most successful songwriters in country music history". Ken Burns of PBS called him an "acclaimed singer-songwriter". In 2019, The Boot further commented on Anderson's legacy: "In fact, one of the most impressive things about Anderson is his versatility: He's the soft voice behind many classic country songs, but he's also the writer or co-writer of plenty of your current favorites." Kevin John Coyne of Country Universe cited Anderson's songwriting as the center of his legacy: "It's been Bill Anderson's songwriting that's kept him topping the country charts for decades longer than even his most successful contemporaries."

In 1975, Anderson was inducted into the Nashville Songwriters Hall of Fame. In 2001, he was inducted into the Country Music Hall of Fame. In November 2002, BMI named him its first country songwriting icon, placing him alongside R&B artists Little Richard, Chuck Berry, Bo Diddley and James Brown as the only recipients of that award. In 2018, he was inducted into the Songwriters Hall of Fame, along with Alan Jackson and John Mellencamp. Anderson has also been placed on several lists of country music's top writers and performers. In 2008, he was ranked 27th on Country Universe list of the "100 Greatest Men of Country Music". He was ranked among the "100 Greatest Country Artists of All Time" in a 2017 list compiled by Rolling Stone.

Discography

Studio albums

 1963: Still
 1964: Bill Anderson Sings
 1964: Showcase
 1966: Bright Lights and Country Music 
 1966: I Love You Drops
 1967: Get While the Gettin's Good
 1967: I Can Do Nothing Alone
 1968: For Loving You 
 1968: Wild Weekend
 1968: Happy State of Mind
 1969: My Life/But You Know I Love You
 1969: Christmas
 1970: If It's All the Same to You 
 1970: Love Is a Sometimes Thing
 1970: Where Have All Our Heroes Gone
 1971: Always Remember
 1972: Bill and Jan (Or Jan and Bill) 
 1972: Singing His Praise 
 1972: Bill Anderson Sings for "All the Lonely Women in the World"
 1972: Don't She Look Good
 1973: Bill
 1974: "Whispering" Bill Anderson
 1975: Every Time I Turn the Radio On/Talk to Me Ohio
 1976: Sometimes 
 1976: Peanuts and Diamonds and Other Jewels
 1977: Scorpio
 1977: Billy Boy & Mary Lou 
 1978: Love...& Other Sad Stories
 1979: Ladies Choice
 1980: Nashville Mirrors
 1983: Southern Fried 
 1984: Yesterday, Today, and Tomorrow
 1986: A Place in the Country
 1993: Country Music Heaven
 1996: Greatest Songs
 1998: Fine Wine
 2001: A Lot of Things Different
 2002: No Place Like Home on Christmas
 2004: Softly & Tenderly
 2005: The Way I Feel
 2007: Whisperin' Bluegrass
 2010: Songwriter
 2014: Life
 2018: Anderson
 2020: The Hits Re-Imagined

Filmography

Awards and nominations

!
|-
| 1965
| rowspan="2"| Grammy Awards
| Best Country Song for "Once a Day"
| 
| 
|-
| rowspan="2"| 1967
| Best Country Song for "Cold Hard Facts of Life"
| 
| 
|-
| rowspan="3"| Country Music Association Awards
| Entertainer of the Year
| 
| 
|-
| 1968
| rowspan="2"| Vocal Duo of the Year 
| 
| 
|-
| 1970
| 
| 
|-
| rowspan="2"| 1975
| Academy of Country Music Awards
| Top Vocal Group 
| 
| 
|-
| Nashville Songwriters Hall of Fame
| Inducted as a Member
| 
| 
|-
| 1976
| rowspan="2"| Country Music Association Awards
| rowspan="2"| Vocal Duo of the Year 
| 
| 
|-
| 1977
| 
| 
|-
| 2000
| Grammy Awards
| Best Country Song for "Two Teardrops" 
| 
| 
|-
| rowspan="3"| 2001
| Academy of Country Music Awards
| rowspan="2"| Vocal Event of the Year for "Too Country" 
| 
| 
|-
| Country Music Association Awards
| 
| 
|-
| Country Music Hall of Fame
| Inducted as a Member
| 
| 
|-
| rowspan="2"| 2002
| BMI Awards
| Songwriting Icon Award
| 
| 
|-
| rowspan="2"| Academy of Country Music Awards
| Song of the Year for "A Lot of Things Different" 
| 
| 
|-
| rowspan="2"| 2004
| rowspan="3"| Song of the Year for "Whiskey Lullaby" )
| 
| 
|-
| rowspan="2"| Country Music Association Awards
| 
| 
|-
| 2005
| 
| 
|-
| 2006
| Academy of Country Music Awards
| Song of the Year for "Give It Away" 
| 
| 
|-
| rowspan="2"| 2007
| Grammy Awards
| Best Country Song for "Give It Away" 
| 
| 
|-
| Country Music Association Awards
| Song of the Year for "Give It Away" 
| 
| 
|-
| 2018
| Songwriters Hall of Fame
| Inducted as a Member
| 
| 
|-
| 2023
| Grammy Awards
| Best American Roots Performance for "Someday It'll All Make Sense" 
| 
| 
|-
|}

References

Footnotes

Books

External links
 
Official website
Bill Anderson at the Country Music Hall of Fame
Whisperin' Bill Anderson Interview NAMM Oral History Library (2009)
 Bill Anderson recordings at the Discography of American Historical Recordings.

1937 births
20th-century American male actors
American country singer-songwriters
American game show hosts
American male singer-songwriters
American male writers
Country Music Hall of Fame inductees
Country musicians from Georgia (U.S. state)
Country musicians from South Carolina
Curb Records artists
Decca Records artists
Grand Ole Opry members
Living people
MCA Records artists
Members of the Country Music Association
Musicians from Columbia, South Carolina
People from Commerce, Georgia
People from Decatur, Georgia
People from DeKalb County, Georgia
University of Georgia alumni
Varèse Sarabande artists
Singer-songwriters from South Carolina
Singer-songwriters from Georgia (U.S. state)